McKinley is an unincorporated community in Coos County, Oregon, United States. McKinley lies along Middle Creek, a tributary of the North Fork Coquille River, northeast of Myrtle Point in the Southern Oregon Coast Range.  
 
Homer Shepherd suggested the name in honor of President William McKinley. Shepherd helped establish the McKinley post office in June 1897 and served as its first postmaster.

References

Unincorporated communities in Coos County, Oregon
1897 establishments in Oregon
Populated places established in 1897
Unincorporated communities in Oregon